.ag is the Internet country code top-level domain (ccTLD) for Antigua and Barbuda.

Second and third level registrations 

Registrations can be made at the second level directly beneath .ag, or at the third level beneath:

 .com.ag or .co.ag (intended for commercial entities)
 .org.ag (intended for organisations, especially nonprofits)
 .net.ag (intended for network operators/providers)
 .nom.ag (intended for individuals)

There are no restrictions on who can register.

Domain hacks
In addition to its original intended use as a country code, the .ag domain has been marketed for use for agriculture-related sites, and for sites referencing the atomic symbol for silver, Ag. It also has a potential use for other domain hacks for English words that end in -ag. The Heritage Foundation uses .ag for URL shortening (herit.ag).

".ag" used to mean "Aktiengesellschaft" 

Aktiengesellschaft, abbreviated AG, is a German term that refers to a corporation that is limited by shares, i.e. owned by shareholders, and may be traded on a stock market. The term is used in Germany, Austria, and Switzerland, but not Liechtenstein or Luxembourg.

Legal status of .ag in Germany
A German court (5. Zivilsenat des Oberlandesgerichtes Hamburg) ruled in July 2004 that a .ag domain may only be registered by an Aktiengesellschaft, and then only by an AG that has the same name as the domain. For example, a company with shareholders in Germany having the name X AG may not register as y.ag.

Use in Greenland
Sermitsiaq uses the TLD.

See also
 Internet in Antigua and Barbuda

References

External links
 List of .AG Registrars 
 IANA .ag whois information

Communications in Antigua and Barbuda
Country code top-level domains
Computer-related introductions in 1991

sv:Toppdomän#A